A soffit is an exterior or interior architectural feature, generally the horizontal, aloft underside of any construction element. Its archetypal form, sometimes incorporating or implying the projection of beams, is the underside of eaves (to connect a retaining wall to projecting edge(s) of the roof). The vertical band at the edge of the roof is called a fascia.

Etymology

Soffits in homes and offices
In architecture, soffit is the underside (but not base) of any construction element.

Examples include:

Under the eaves of a roof

In foremost use soffit is the first definition in the table above. In spatial analysis, it is one of the two necessary planes of any (3-dimensional) optionally built area, eaves, which projects, for such area to be within the building's space.

In two-dimensional face analysis it is a discrete face almost always parallel with the ground that bridges the gap(s) between a building's siding (walls) and either: their parallel extraneous plane (fascia) where such exists; or where no such plane, a point along (or the abrupt end of) the roof's outer projection (overhang).  Soffits and fascias are archetypally screwed or nailed to rafters known as lookout rafters or lookouts for short, their repair being often undertaken simultaneously.  A parapet wall or cornice tend to preclude eaves, as an alternate design, both favouring flat roofs and weather-proof walls. Very pronounced overhangs (eaves) are characteristic to European architecture to shield the walls from rain, sleet and snow such as Swiss chalet style, Dutch, Romanian, and Tudor architecture.

Soffit exposure profile (from wall to fascia) on a building's exterior can vary from a few centimetres (2–3 inches) to 3 feet or more, depending on construction. It can be non-ventilated or ventilated, to prevent condensation.  A grill that covers the venting opening on the bottom of the soffit is called a soffit vent. A soffit joist can be added to the framework instead of or in addition to lookouts.

See also
 Copper in architecture

References

 

Ceilings
Roofs